Philip Deignan (born 7 September 1983) is an Irish former professional road racing cyclist, who rode professionally between 2005 and 2018 for the , , ,  and  squads. A former Olympian, Deignan won a stage in the 2009 Vuelta a España, and finished in the top ten in the general classification.

Career

Early career
Born in Letterkenny, County Donegal, Deignan first competed on a bike in 1997 during the annual Sligo to Letterkenny charity cycle. He attended St Eunan's College for his secondary education. Before turning professional in 2005, he rode for amateur club  where he performed well.

In the Baby Giro of 2004 after recovering from an earlier crash, he performed well on the mountainous stages. He won the final stage and the general classification of the 2004 Ronde de l'Isard as an amateur. His first professional road race win was in the Tour du Doubs when he attacked a breakaway group that contained his fellow Irishman and teammate at the time Mark Scanlon. Other notable performances were ninth place in the UCI World Championships Under 23 road race, fifth place in European championship under 23 road race, and second place on a mountainous stage of the 2006 Tour de l'Avenir stage race.

After an injury-plagued early season, Deignan entered and finished his first grand tour with the 2007 Vuelta a España, where he finished prominently with 10th, 12th and 16th in several mountain stages.

He qualified to represent Ireland at the 2008 Beijing Olympics. He finished in 81st place (15 minutes and 53 seconds behind winner Samuel Sánchez and five minutes behind team mate Nicolas Roche) in the  road race on 9 August. Deignan along with Roche and Roger Aiken made up the Irish team for the 2008 World Championships in Varese on 28 September. None of the three finished the demanding  race.

Cervélo TestTeam (2009–2010)

He raced the Giro d'Italia, achieving a top ten finish in one stage and featuring prominently in others, with his team winning 4 stages in total. By finishing 10 minutes clear of the peloton he climbed to 9th in the general classification. He became the first Irishman to win a stage on a Grand Tour since Stephen Roche's last-stage success at the Tour de France in 1992. Deignan was selected to ride for Ireland in the 2009 World Elite Road Race Championship in Mendrisio, Switzerland (23–27 September) alongside Nicolas Roche and Dan Martin. After his Vuelta performance, Deignan reached a personal high 2009 world ranking of 71st. Deignan was the best Irish finisher when placing 40th at the 2009 UCI Road World Championships – Men's road race in Mendrisio. He ended the 2009 season UCI ranked 75th, with 61 points, which helped Ireland to 16th in the team rankings.

RadioShack (2011)

United Healthcare (2012–2013)
Deignan was able to rebuild his career with the US-based squad, winning the Tour of the Gila in 2013, and recording top ten overall finishes in the three biggest US stage races, the Tour of Utah (6th), the Tour of California (9th) and the USA Pro Cycling Challenge (10th).

Team Sky (2014–2018)
Subsequently, Deignan announced he was returning to the UCI World Tour in 2014 by joining . He rode the Giro d'Italia which began in Belfast and travelled to Dublin in the opening stages. Deignan led Sky at the Tour de Pologne, finishing seventh overall. He also rode the Vuelta a España, where he helped Chris Froome to second overall.

In November 2018, Deignan announced his retirement from professional cycling.

Personal life
Deignan married fellow professional road racing cyclist Lizzie Armitstead in Otley on 17 September 2016. Deignan resides in Monaco.

Major results

2004
 1st Overall Ronde de l'Isard
1st Stages 2 & 5
 National Road Championships
2nd Under-23 road race
4th Road race
 6th Boucle de l'Artois
 8th Liège–Bastogne–Liège U23
 10th Paris–Mantes-en-Yvelines
2005
 1st Tour du Doubs
 5th Road race, UEC European Under-23 Road Championships
 7th Overall Tour de la Région Wallonne
 8th Overall Paris–Corrèze
 9th Road race, UCI Under-23 Road World Championships
2009
 7th Overall Vuelta a Castilla y León
 8th Giro del Mendrisiotto
 9th Overall Vuelta a España
1st Stage 18
 10th Overall Vuelta a Burgos
2013
 1st  Overall Tour of the Gila
1st  Mountains classification
 2nd Overall Tour de Beauce
 6th Overall Tour of Utah
 9th Overall Tour of California
 10th Overall USA Pro Cycling Challenge
2014
 7th Overall Tour de Pologne
2015
 5th Overall Tour de Yorkshire

Grand Tour general classification results timeline

References

External links

 Philip Deignan profile at Team Sky

1983 births
Living people
Cyclists at the 2008 Summer Olympics
Irish male cyclists
Irish Vuelta a España stage winners
Olympic cyclists of Ireland
People educated at St Eunan's College
People from Letterkenny
Sportspeople from County Donegal